Thomas Curran may refer to:

Thomas Curran (university president) (born 1955), President of Rockhurst University in Kansas City, Missouri
Thomas J. Curran (1898–1958), Secretary of State of New York, 1943–1955
Thomas John Curran (1924–2012), U.S. federal judge
Thomas A. Curran (1879–1941), American actor
Thomas Curran (South Sligo MP) (1840–1913), Member of Parliament (MP) for South Sligo, 1892–1900
Thomas Bartholomew Curran (1870–1929), his son, barrister and MP for the constituencies of Kilkenny City and North Donegal
Thomas Curran (Illinois politician) (1868–1928), American businessman and politician
Tom Curran (cricketer) (born 1995), South African-born English cricketer

See also
Tom Curren (born 1964), American surfer
Tom Curren (footballer) (born 1992), Australian rules footballer